Potyosy is a village in Bezhetsky District of Tver Oblast, Russia.

References

Rural localities in Bezhetsky District
Bezhetsky Uyezd